The 18th Air Refueling Squadron is a United States Air Force Reserve squadron, assigned to the 931st Air Refueling Wing at McConnell Air Force Base, Kansas. It operates the Boeing KC-135R Stratotanker aircraft conducting air refueling missions. If mobilized the squadron would be gained by Air Mobility Command. 

The squadron was first activated during World War II as the 18th Transport Squadron.  After training in the United States, the squadron deployed to the Mediterranean Theater of Operations, where, as the 18th Troop Carrier Squadron,  it participated in all major airborne assault operations and earned a Distinguished Unit Citation.  From April until June 1944, it deployed to the China Burma India Theater to augment forces in Burma.  Following V-E Day, the squadron served under Air Transport Command in the Caribbean returning American soldiers to the United States.  The squadron was again briefly active in the Caribbean area during the later 1940s.

The squadron was active again from 1952, when it absorbed the resources of a reserve unit that had been mobilized for the Korean War.  It was again active from 1961 until 1972, when it participated in military exercises, provided airlift, and trained aircrew for deployment to Southeast Asia.

Mission
The squadron operates the KC-135 Stratotanker aircraft, conducting aerial refueling missions.

History
"During World War II the 18th flew airborne assaults on Sicily, Myitkyina, Burma, and Southern France in addition to supporting partisans in Northern Italy from January to May 1945 and conducting aerial transportation in the Mediterranean Theater of Operations (MTO) and briefly in the China-Burma-India Theater (CBI). It flew strategic and tactical airlift missions from 1948 to 1954 and 1962 to 1967. The squadron provided tactical airlift training for US and subsequently South Vietnamese pilots and crews from 1969 to 1972.

This unit has flown worldwide air refueling missions since 1995."

Operations
World War II
Operation Husky (the invasion of Sicily) 
Operation Dragoon (the invasion of southern France) 
Operation Joint Endeavor (Peacekeeping in Bosnia Herzegovina) 
Operation Joint Guard (Peacekeeping in Bosnia Herzegovina), 21 June 1996 – 19 June 1998 
Operation Joint Forge (Peacekeeping in Bosnia Herzegovina), June 201998 – 12 February 2004
Southern Watch (enforcing a no-fly zone in pre-war southern Iraq) 
Northern Watch (enforcing a no-fly zone in pre-war northern Iraq)
Operation Desert Fox (December 1998 bombing of Iraq)
Operation Enduring Freedom (The Global War on Terror)
Operation Iraqi Freedom (2003 Iraq War) 
Operation Noble Eagle ( US homeland security)

Lineage
 Constituted as the 18th Transport Squadron on 20 November 1940
 Activated on 11 December 1940
 Redesignated 18th Troop Carrier Squadron on 4 July 1942
 Inactivated on 31 July 1945
 Redesignated 18th Troop Carrier Squadron, Heavy on 24 July 1948
 Activated on 1 August 1948
 Inactivated on 1 March 1949
 Redesignated 18th Troop Carrier Squadron, Medium on 3 July 1952
 Activated on 14 July 1952
 Inactivated on 21 July 1954
 Activated on 3 August 1961 (not organized)
 Organized on 8 January 1962
 Redesignated 18th Troop Carrier Squadron on 1 March 1966
 Discontinued and inactivated, on 25 June 1967
 Redesignated 18th Tactical Airlift Training Squadron on 14 August 1969
 Activated on 15 October 1969
 Inactivated on 31 August 1972
 Redesignated 18th Air Refueling Squadron on 9 September 1994
 Activated in the reserve on 1 October 1995

Assignments
 64th Transport Group (later 64 Troop Carrier Group), 11 December 1940 – 31 July 1945
 5700th Composite Wing, 1 August 1948 – 1 March 1949
 64th Troop Carrier Group, 14 July 1952 – 21 July 1954
 Tactical Air Command, 3 August 1961 (not organized)
 64th Troop Carrier Wing, 8 January 1962
 516th Troop Carrier Wing, 1 January 1963
 314th Troop Carrier Wing, 1 July 1963
 317th Troop Carrier Wing (later 317th Tactical Airlift Wing), 1 April 1965 – 25 June 1967
 516th Tactical Airlift Wing, 15 October 1969
 463d Tactical Airlift Wing, 1 June – 31 August 1972
 931st Air Refueling Group, 1 October 1995 – present

Stations

 McClellan Field, California, 11 December 1940
 March Field, California, 11 July 1941
 Westover Field, Massachusetts, 9 June–31 July 1942
 RAF Ramsbury, England, 18 August–c. November 1942 (operated From Maison Blanche Airport, Algeria after 11 November 1942)
 Blida Airfield, Algeria, 16 December 1942
 Kairouan Airfield, Tunisia, 1 July 1943
 El Djem Airfield, Tunisia, 26 July 1943
 Comiso Airfield, Italy, 8 September 1943 (operated from bases in India, April–27 June 1944)
 Ciampino Airfield, Italy, 10 July 1944 (operated From: Istres Air Base, France 7 September – 11 November 1944)

 Rosignano Airfield, Italy, 9 January – 23 May 1945
 Waller Field, Trinidad, 4 June – 31 July 1945
 Albrook Air Force Base, Panama Canal Zone, 1 August 1948 – 1 March 1949
 Donaldson Air Force Base, South Carolina, 14 July 1952 – 21 July 1954
 Dyess Air Force Base, Texas, 8 January 1962
 Sewart Air Force Base, Tennessee, 1 July 1963
 Lockbourne Air Force Base, Ohio, 1 April 1965 – 25 June 1967
 Dyess Air Force Base, Texas, 15 October 1969 – 31 August 1972
 McConnell Air Force Base, Kansas, 1 October 1995 – present

Aircraft

 Douglas C-47 Skytrain (1941–1945)
 Douglas C-54 Skymaster (1948–1949)
 Fairchild C-82 Packet (1951–1953)
 Fairchild C-119 Flying Boxcar (1953–1954)
 Lockheed C-130 Hercules (1962–1967)
 de Havilland Canada C-7 Caribou (1969–1972)
 Boeing KC-135 Stratotanker (1995–present)

References

Notes
 Explanatory notes

 Citations

Bibliography

External links
 

018
Military units and formations in Kansas